The 1944 Third Air Force Gremlins football team represented the Third Air Force during the 1944 college football season. The team compiled a 7–3 record.  The Third Air Force was part of the United States Army Air Forces and was based in 1944 at Morris Field in Charlotte, North Carolina.

The team played a 10-game schedule against other military service teams and defeated the Second Air Force team that was ranked No. 20 in the final 1944 AP Poll. Its three losses were against teams ranked in the top 20 in the final poll: Randolph Field (No. 3); Great Lakes (No. 17); and Fort Pierce (No. 18).

J. Quinn Decker, who coached at Centre College before the war, was the team's head coach. The team's key players included backs Charley Trippi (left halfback), Ernie Bonelli (right halfback), Bob Kennedy (fullback), and Frank Gnup (quarterback), and linemen Art Brandau (center), Walt Barnes, and Jack Karwales. Trippi was named as a first-team player on the Associated Press' 1944 Service All-America team.

Schedule

References

Third Air Force
Third Air Force Gremlins football seasons
Third Air Force Gremlins football